María Luisa Souza (born 21 November 1941) is a Mexican former freestyle swimmer. She competed at the 1960 Summer Olympics and the 1964 Summer Olympics.

References

External links
 

1941 births
Living people
Mexican female freestyle swimmers
Olympic swimmers of Mexico
Swimmers at the 1960 Summer Olympics
Swimmers at the 1964 Summer Olympics
Swimmers from Mexico City
Pan American Games medalists in swimming
Pan American Games bronze medalists for Mexico
Swimmers at the 1959 Pan American Games
Central American and Caribbean Games gold medalists for Mexico
Central American and Caribbean Games medalists in swimming
Competitors at the 1959 Central American and Caribbean Games
Competitors at the 1962 Central American and Caribbean Games
Medalists at the 1959 Pan American Games
20th-century Mexican women
21st-century Mexican women